is a railway station in the city of Kōnan, Aichi Prefecture,  Japan, operated by Meitetsu.

Lines

Station layout
The station has a single island platforms connected to the station building by an underground passage. The station has automated ticket machines, Manaca automated turnstiles and is staffed..

Platforms

Adjacent stations

Station history
The station was renamed to its present name on 10 September 1981.

Passenger statistics
In fiscal 2015, the station was used by an average of 27,133 passengers daily.

Surrounding area
 Kōnan City Hall

See also
 List of Railway Stations in Japan

References

External links

 Official web page 

Railway stations in Japan opened in 1912
Railway stations in Aichi Prefecture
Stations of Nagoya Railroad
Kōnan, Aichi